Phosphoric acid fuel cells (PAFC) are a type of fuel cell that uses liquid phosphoric acid as an electrolyte. They were the first fuel cells to be commercialized. Developed in the mid-1960s and field-tested since the 1970s, they have improved significantly in stability, performance, and cost. Such characteristics have made the PAFC a good candidate for early stationary applications.

Design
Electrolyte is highly concentrated or pure liquid phosphoric acid (H3PO4) saturated in a silicon carbide (SiC) matrix. Operating range is about 150 to 210 °C. The electrodes are made of carbon paper coated with a finely dispersed platinum catalyst.

Electrode reactions

Anode reaction: 2H2(g) → 4H+ + 4e‾

Cathode reaction: O2(g) + 4H+ + 4e‾ → 2H2O

Overall cell reaction: 2 H2 + O2 → 2H2O

Advantages and disadvantages
At an operating range of 150 to 200 °C, the expelled water can be converted to steam for air and water heating (combined heat and power). This potentially allows efficiency increases of up to 70%. PAFCs are CO2-tolerant and can tolerate a CO concentration of about 1.5%, which broadens the choice of fuels they can use. If gasoline is used, the sulfur must be removed.  At lower temperatures phosphoric acid is a poor ionic conductor, and CO poisoning of the platinum electro-catalyst in the anode becomes severe. However, they are much less sensitive to CO than proton-exchange membrane fuel cells (PEMFC) and alkaline fuel cells (AFC).

Disadvantages include rather low power density and chemically aggressive electrolyte.

Applications

PAFC have been used for stationary power generators with output in the 100 kW to 400 kW range and are also finding application in large vehicles such as buses.

Major manufacturers of PAFC technology include Doosan Fuel Cell America Inc. (formerly ClearEdge Power & UTC Power) and Fuji Electric.

India's DRDO has developed PAFC based air-independent propulsion for integration into their s.

See also

 Glossary of fuel cell terms

References

External links
 National Pollutant Inventory - Phosphoric acid fact sheet
 UTC Power Official Site
 Photo Gallery of Fuel Cells Being Used Today
 Cox Communications Installs Fuel Cells in California
D.O.E. -PAFC
 Fuel Cell Basics
 Alternative Energy Magazine
 Supermarket Benefits From 400kW Fuel Cell
 Stationary Fuel Cells at Retail and Grocery Sites

Fuel cells

ko:연료전지#인산형 연료전지 (Phosphoric Acid Fuel Cell, PAFC)
ja:燃料電池#りん酸形燃料電池 (PAFC)